Bidwell is an English surname. Notable people with the surname include: 

 Adonijah Bidwell (1716–1784), first minister of Housatonic Township No. 1
 Annie Bidwell (1839–1918), wife of John Bidwell
 Barnabas Bidwell (1763–1833), Canadian and US-American politician
 Belinda Bidwell (1936–2007), first female Speaker of the National Assembly of The Gambia
 Charles Bidwell, US-American professor of education
 Edward John Bidwell (1866–1941), former Bishop of Ontario
 Everett Bidwell (1899–1991), US-American politician
 George Bidwell (1832-1899), inventor, conman, forger, famously embezzled from the Bank of England, and authored his autobiography “Forging His Chains”
 George R. Bidwell (1858-1948), pioneering bicycle salesman, manufacturer, and politician
 Jake Bidwell (born 1993), English footballer
 Jared Bidwell (born 1987), Australian rower
 John Bidwell (1620-1687), founding member along with Thomas Hooker of Hartford, CT
 John Bidwell (1819–1900), US-American politician
 John Carne Bidwill (1815–1853), botanist and explorer in Australia, Canada & New Zealand
 Josh Bidwell (born 1976), US-American footballer
 Julie Bidwell (born 1973), Fox News anchor who also goes by Julie Banderas
 Luis Bolín-Bidwell, Spanish/English Journalist and Press Officer for Francisco Franco
 Marshall Spring Bidwell (1799–1872), lawyer and Canadian politician
 Mary Electa Bidwell (1881–1996), US-American supercentenarian
 Regent Alfred John Bidwell, an English architect best known for his work in colonial era Singapore
 Robin Leonard Bidwell (1929–1994), British orientalist and author
 Shelford Bidwell (1848–1909), English physicist and inventor
 Shelford Bidwell (historian) (1913–1996), English soldier  and historian
 Syd Bidwell (1917–1997), former British Labour MP

Bidwell is also a given name. Notable people with the given name Bidwell include:

 Bidwell Adam (1894–1982), Mississippi lawyer and politician

See also
Bidwill (surname)